Igor Thiago Nascimento Rodrigues (born 26 June 2001), known as Igor Thiago or just Thiago, is a Brazilian footballer who plays as a forward for Ludogorets Razgrad.

Life and career

Cruzeiro
On January 22, 2020, Thiago made his professional debut when he started for Cruzeiro in their Campeonato Mineiro match against Boa Esporte Clube.

Ludogorets Razgrad
After a series of rumours, on 2 March 2022, Thiago finally signed with the Bulgarian champions Ludogorets Razgrad. He joined the Ludogorets II to adapt better with the Bulgarian team and made his debut for the second team on 18 April in a league match against Litex Lovech, scoring his debut goal in the match. A week later he scored 2 goals for the second team in the league match against Dobrudzha Dobrich. 
His good start for the second team granted him a call-up for the first team where he made his debut in a league match against CSKA Sofia with Igor Thiago coming on as a substitute and scoring his debut goal for the first team as well.

Career statistics

Honours

Ludogorets Razgrad
Bulgarian First League: 2021–22
Bulgarian Supercup: 2022

References

External links
 

2001 births
Living people
Brazilian footballers
Association football forwards
Campeonato Brasileiro Série B players
First Professional Football League (Bulgaria) players
Cruzeiro Esporte Clube players
PFC Ludogorets Razgrad II players
PFC Ludogorets Razgrad players
Brazilian expatriate footballers
Expatriate footballers in Bulgaria
Sportspeople from Pará